Danila Olegovich Chechyotkin (born 22 August 2000) is a Russian football player. He plays as centre-back for FC Khimik-Avgust Vurnary.

Club career
He made his debut in the Russian Football National League for FC Nizhny Novgorod on 11 May 2019 in a game against FC Krasnodar-2.

References

External links
 Profile by Russian Football National League
 
 

2000 births
Sportspeople from Nizhny Novgorod
Living people
Russian footballers
Association football defenders
FC Nizhny Novgorod (2015) players
FC Saturn Ramenskoye players
FC Tekstilshchik Ivanovo players
FC Khimik Dzerzhinsk players
Russian First League players
Russian Second League players